The Royal Sussex County Hospital is an acute teaching hospital in Brighton, England. Together with the Princess Royal Hospital, it is administered by the University Hospitals Sussex NHS Foundation Trust. The services provided at the hospital include an emergency department, cancer services at the Sussex Cancer Centre, cardiac surgery, maternity services, and both adult and neonatal intensive care units.

History
The main building was designed by Charles Barry, who was later architect for the Houses of Parliament, and is still called the Barry Building. The foundation stone was laid by the Earl of Egremont on 16 March 1826, and the hospital was opened as the Sussex County Hospital on 11 June 1828. The Victoria Wing was added in 1839, and the Adelaide Wing was opened in 1841. The Sussex County Hospital became the Royal Sussex County Hospital in about 1911.

On New Year's Day 1872, a fire broke out on the top floor of the Adelaide Wing of the hospital, in Ward 6. Initially this fire threatened to destroy the building, but the efforts of volunteer firefighters and a detachment of the 19th Hussars saved the building.

The Jubilee Building was added to the hospital in 1887 and the Sussex Eye Hospital (one of local architect John Leopold Denman's many Neo-Georgian buildings) opened in 1935.

In October 1984, after the Provisional IRA bombed the Grand Hotel where members of the Government were staying during the Conservative Party annual conference, the hospital received many of the injured.

In 2005 an episode of the BBC investigative programme Panorama featured secretly filmed material taken by a nurse and an undercover journalist. The programme highlighted serious failings in the standards of care and procedures and showed scenes that were described by the Chief Executive of the Brighton and Sussex University Hospitals NHS Trust, which was responsible for the hospital, as "very disturbing images".

The Millennium Building was completed in 2000 and the Audrey Emerton Building, built to accommodate clinical medical students of Brighton and Sussex Medical School, was opened by Baroness Emerton in 2005. In 2009 there was a proposal to demolish the Barry and Jubilee buildings as part of a £300m redevelopment scheme. On 1 May 2014, £420 million of public investment was approved for redevelopment works starting in late 2014 and expected to last until 2024.

3Ts Redevelopment 
The 3Ts Redevelopment is a three-stage project which is replacing all of the buildings on the front half of the hospital, some of which are almost 200 years old. The three Ts stand for trauma, teaching and tertiary care. It was expected to cost £485 million when it was approved, but by 2021 was significantly delayed and over budget. The whole project is expected to be completed by 2026.

In the old buildings' place will be two brand new clinical buildings, which will cover around 40 new wards and departments. The Stage 1 building is the first of the two, and covers 13 floors, 11 of which are above ground.

Stage 2 will be a new cancer centre, and Stage 3 will be a new service yard.

The project is being carried out in three stages to ensure that all clinical service can continue to run during construction.  work is currently on Stage 1 and the helideck. According to BSUH, there is about a year to go until Stage 1 of the redevelopment is complete.

Helideck 

Stage 1 is also providing a much needed helideck for air ambulances on top of the Thomas Kemp Tower, from which the most severe patients can be taken directly to A&E via a dedicated lift. Air ambulances taking patients to the hospital currently have to land at East Brighton Park, almost a mile away.

The helideck was originally expected to be in use by 2019, but  it still hasn't been used. The first delays were due to the COVID-19 pandemic, but now is due to fears that helicopters may blow the cladding off of the hospital's walls. Plans to launch it in November 2022 were shelved after surveys found aircraft could damage the tower it sits on.

See also
List of hospitals in England
List of medical schools in the United Kingdom
Brighton and Sussex Medical School
Healthcare in Sussex

References

Further reading

External links 

 
 Inspection reports from the Care Quality Commission

Hospital buildings completed in 1828
Hospital buildings completed in 1839
Buildings and structures in Brighton and Hove
Hospitals in East Sussex
NHS hospitals in England
Charles Barry buildings
1828 establishments in England
1839 establishments in England